Anatoliy Petrovych Fedoruk (born 10 May 1972) is a Ukrainian politician serving as mayor of Bucha, Kyiv Region, Ukraine since 7 April 1998. He is Chairman of the Board of the Kyiv Regional Branch of the Association of Ukrainian Cities.

Biography
In 1992 and 1993 Anatoly Fedoruk was a history teacher at a secondary school in his native Velyka Medvedivka, Khmelnytska Oblast. From 1993 to 1997 he was mayor of the local municipality.

In 1997 and 1998 Fedoruk was teacher at a Bucha secondary orphanage. Fedoruk was first elected mayor of Bucha in 1998; he was reelected in 2006, 2010, 2015 and 2020. In 2010 he was elected as a candidate of the pro-Russian Party of Regions. In 2015 he was elected for New Faces and in 2020 as a candidate of Servant of the People.

In 2011 Fedoruk became Chairman of the Board of the Kyiv Regional Branch of the Association of Ukrainian Cities.

In the 2014 Ukrainian parliamentary election, this time as a self-nominated candidate, in electoral district 95, Fedoruk failed to win a parliamentary seat, losing to Mykhailo Havryliuk.

In 2017 Fedoruk was suspected of abuse of power. Hearings have been going on for several years but are constantly postponed.

Anatoly Fedoruk attracted international attention in the aftermath of the Battle of Bucha that lasted from 27 February 2022 to 31 March 2022, during which time the Bucha massacre occurred. In an interview with the Italian newspaper Corriere della Sera published on 5 April 2022, he said that the Russian soldiers had killed Bucha residents "out of anger or for enjoyment". The same day, in a video message he urged in particular medical doctors and utility company employees to return to the city.

References

Living people
1972 births
Mayors of places in Ukraine
People from Khmelnytskyi Oblast
Party of Regions politicians
Servant of the People (political party) politicians